The Clan Pt. 1 Lost (also stylized as The Clan Pt. 1 'LOST') is the third extended play and the first part of The Clan series by the South Korean boy group Monsta X. It was released by Starship Entertainment and distributed by LOEN Entertainment on May 18, 2016. It consists of six tracks, including the singles "Ex Girl", "All In", and "Stuck".

Background and release
In April 2016, the group announced that they would release The Clan series, revealing the first concept as Part 1: LOST. On May 9, the track "Ex Girl" featuring Mamamoo's Wheein was pre-released. On May 18, the title track "All In" was released, alongside the EP.

The group held their comeback showcase on May 18 at Yes24 Live Hall in Seoul and was streamed live on Naver's V App.

The music video for the title track was released on the Starship's and 1theK's official YouTube channels on the same day, directed by the award-winning film director Dee Shin.

The EP was released in two versions; Found and Lost.

Composition
The EP depicts the loss and pain of youth, containing young people who live with pain in their hearts and having tragic ending through loss.

The track "Ex Girl" is a mellow pop R&B track, describing a man's regret about the one who got away. The title track "All In" is a hip hop track that highlights the group's signature powerful sound and move; it also features a thumping beat and furious raps.

Critical reception
Writing for Dazed, Taylor Glasby described the music video of "All In" as ambitious and provocative, "but the video almost backseats the song to a soundtrack", which Glasby also describes as "far better than the MV gives it the chance to be, particularly the crooning chorus".

Listicles

Commercial performance
As of 2022, the EP had sold over 100,000 units in South Korea. It also peaked at number three on the weekly Gaon Album Chart.

"Ex Girl" and "All In" debuted at numbers 118 and 159 on the weekly Gaon Digital Chart, respectively, while "All In" and "Stuck" debuted at numbers 6 and 11 on the weekly Billboard World Digital Song Sales chart, respectively.

Track listing

Charts

Album

Weekly charts

Monthly chart

Year-end chart

Songs

Weekly charts

Sales

Awards and nominations

Release history

See also
 List of K-pop songs on the Billboard charts
 List of K-pop albums on the Billboard charts
 List of K-pop songs on the World Digital Song Sales chart

References

2016 EPs
Korean-language EPs
Kakao M EPs
Monsta X EPs
Starship Entertainment EPs